Red Raven is the name of three separate fictional characters appearing in American comic books published by Marvel Comics. These characters are the original Red Raven, a flying superhero, who appeared in print once in 1940, then not again until 1968, and occasionally since then; the second Red Raven, named Dania, who is a flying superhero and daughter of the original Red Raven, who first appeared in print in 1992, and occasionally since then; and Redford Raven, a Wild West villain who owned a set of medicine-enchanted wings, was also called Red Raven, and has appeared in print three times, in 1964, 1985, and 1987.

Publication history
The first Red Raven, created by writer Joe Simon and artist Louis Cazeneuve, first appeared in Red Raven Comics #1 (cover-dated Aug. 1940), published by Marvel's predecessor, Timely Comics, during the Golden Age of Comic Books. The title was canceled after its premiere issue. When the unnamed character was a baby, his parents were killed when an airplane flew through a cloud and ran into the airborne island of the Bird People. The birds raised him as their own, and gave him artificial wings.

The character remained unused for more than two decades before returning as an antagonist in the story "Red Raven, Red Raven" in X-Men #44 (May 1968). The Red Raven then battled Namor, the Sub-Mariner in Sub-Mariner #26 (June 1970). In Marvel Premiere #29 (April 1976), Red Raven was shown to have been a member of the stateside World War II-era superhero team the Liberty Legion. In that capacity he and his teammates guest-starred in Marvel Two-In-One Annual #1 (1976) and The Invaders #6 (May 1976). He appeared in flashback cameos in Thor Annual #12 (1984) and  Fantastic Four #405 (Oct. 1995). Although presumed dead for years, he eventually returned in Nova vol. 3 #4-5 (Aug.-Sept. 1999), and guest-starred in The Defenders #6-7 (Aug. - Sept. 2001) and The Order #2 (May 2002).

Dania first appeared in Marvel Super-Heroes #8 (January, 1992) and was created by Scott Lobdell and Chris Wozniak. She has also appeared in Nova vol. 3 #7, The Defenders vol. 2 #6, The New Invaders #2, and is mentioned in Civil War: Battle Damage Report. The character appears briefly in Avengers Arena, but is killed in the second issue.

Redford Raven appeared in Rawhide Kid #38 (February 1964), and West Coast Avengers Volume 2 #18 (March 1987). He also appeared in a dream sequence in Rawhide Kid vol. 2 (four-issue limited edition) #4 (November, 1985).

Fictional character biography

Original Red Raven

Sky-Island (or the Aerie) is an "island" which floats in the sky above the Atlantic Ocean, inhabited by the Bird-People or Winged Ones, an avian offshoot of the human-alien hybrid race known as the Inhumans, who had long ago left the hidden Inhuman city Attilan, built their own abode, and learned to stabilize their genetics to reproduce only in this winged form. The island was kept aloft by antigravity drives and hidden from human civilization by artificial clouds.

An airplane crashed into the Sky-Island, killing all passengers except a small boy. The Bird-People raised the boy, equipped their adopted son with a uniform outfitted with anti-gravitons for flight and artificial wings for navigation, and sent him back to the human world as Red Raven. His first adventure (set in around 1940) was preventing the gangsters Zeelmo and Ratoga from stealing the world's supply of gold and starting a second Great Depression.

In 1942, Bucky formed the Liberty Legion with Red Raven and other superheroes, battling foes such as the Red Skull and Iron Cross. The Liberty Legion disbanded in 1945 and Red Raven went to Europe, where on April 25 of that year he was one of many superheroes involved in the capture of Berlin.

Disillusioned by war, Red Raven returned to Sky-Island, where he discovered that the Bird-People planned to conquer human civilization. Red Raven foiled their plot by using gas to place the tribe, including himself, in suspended animation, and sank their domed island to the bottom of the ocean, setting a timer to return them to the surface and reawaken them after several years. When the island eventually resurfaced near the end of the suspended-animation cycle, the superhero Angel of the X-Men stumbled upon the island. Angel and Red Raven clashed when the latter was startled by the former. Angel believed it would be more humane to revive the Bird-People, but Red Raven disagreed. He again sank the island to protect the secret of the Bird-People, continuing the suspended animation process, and set Angel adrift on a raft.

Sometime later, following an undersea earthquake, the Red Raven's suspended-animation capsule broke loose. It floated to the surface, where Red Raven was found by his old wartime ally the Sub-Mariner. The imperfect suspended-animation technology that he had used, however, had begun to drive Red Raven insane. He tried to awaken the Bird-People to join their crusade against humanity, but was thwarted by Namor. His condition worsened when he discovered that the Bird-People had all died. In a mad rage, he accidentally caused an explosion that engulfed him and the entire island.

Sometime throughout all this, Red Raven had a daughter, Dania, who became a superhero, also under the name Red Raven.

Red Raven eventually reappeared alive, and revealed that he'd faked his own death, that of the Bird People, and the sinking of the island. The Defenders are later brought to the Red Raven's sky-island and clash with the Raven. The Red Raven also encounters The Order on his island.

Red Raven later attacked New Attilan with an army of disfigured Bird-People. After capturing Medusa, he revealed that the Bird-People were actually an ancient offshoot of the Inhuman race that had learned how to develop powers without the need of the Terrigen Mist. When Black Bolt activated the Terrigenesis Bomb during the Infinity storyline, it caused the Bird-People including Red Raven's wife Vera to undergo monstrous transformations. Red Raven sought vengeance by attempting to destroy New Attilan, but was stopped after the new Captain America was able to reach Vera and show that her mind was still intact inside her deformed body. Captain America and Spider-Man eventually talked down Red Raven while Medusa volunteered to help find a way to restore the Bird People. While recovering from his injuries, Red Raven was visited by Steve Rogers who tells them that the world is in good hands.

Second Red Raven (Dania)

Dania is a Bird-Person who was hatched on the floating island of Aerie (Sky-Island). By age 14, Dania had spent most of her life watching the video feeds of Namor and thought that he was responsible for the death of her father (presumed to be the original Red Raven).

Namor's company Oracle Inc. sought to study the sunken Sky-Island and its technology. However, the workers were attacked by Diablo, who sought to harness the technology for himself. Dania flew there to protect her people while Diablo resurrected the Bird-People from their suspended animation, leaving Dania and Namor to fight them off. One of the Bird-People brought back to life was Dania's father, which left Dania distraught until Namor defeated him. Diablo departed after rigging explosives that destroyed Sky-Island. Dania chided Namor for his interference with Sky-Island (though she did win a grudging respect for the hero). Dania's father later organized his people into building a new Sky-Island.

During the Civil War storyline, Dania was listed as a foreign national by Tony Stark and was reported to still be active in the United States.

As part of the Marvel NOW! event, Dania is among the teenage superheroes that were captured by Arcade and forced to fight for his amusement in the pages of Avengers Arena. She becomes the second casualty of Arcade's schemes when she tries to escape by flying upward and has her neck broken by an invisible forcefield. When Death Locket stumbles into an underground facility, she finds a room where Red Raven's body is stored alongside the others who have died in battle.

Redford Raven ("Red Raven")

In the Wild West, Redford Raven is a bank robber who led his own gang into a series of robberies until they ran afoul of Rawhide Kid, who defeated the bank robbers and handed them over to the authorities. While in prison, Redford Raven shared a cell with a dying Navajo medicine man. The medicine man decided to share his secrets with Redford: He had designed a winged harness that, treated with a secret herb, could be worn by a man and permit him to glide upon the winds. The old Navajo trained Raven in the use of these wings until he died from his illness. Redford Raven tricked the guard into letting him escape by hovering to the ceiling and slipping out. Upon becoming Red Raven, he was able to safely escape the prison simply by flying out of reach of the guards.

Red Raven's first action was to take revenge on Rawhide Kid. Not realizing Red Raven's new abilities, Rawhide Kid fired at Red Raven, who dodged every bullet. Red Raven then shot Rawhide Kid and left him for dead. Rawhide Kid was saved and nursed back to health by a young Navajo who was the son of the Navajo medicine man who gave Redford Raven his powers. Upon having recovered, Rawhide Kid was trained by the Navajo man into using the wings so that he can be on equal grounds with Red Raven. Upon finding Red Raven, Rawhide Kid was still trying to get a hang of operating the flying harness. Red Raven made a mistake of flying in front of the sun, enabling Rawhide Kid to shoot Red Raven's gun from his hand. Rawhide Kid then wrestled with Red Raven and brought him to the ground. The young Navajo man then burnt both wings in order to protect the secret.

Redford Raven later came to own a new pair of wings and had joined forces with Iron Mask's gang (consisting of Dr. Danger, Fat Man, Hurricane, and Rattler). Upon being inspired by Kang the Conqueror's brief sojourn in their timeline, they began to commit high-scaled thefts until the time-traveling West Coast Avengers showed up, along with contemporary heroes Rawhide Kid, Two-Gun Kid and the Phantom Rider, and stopped the criminals in their tracks. Red Raven ended up fighting Iron Man and proved totally ineffectual against him; Iron Man tore off his wings, dropping him to the ground. Red Raven and the other criminals were arrested and handed over to the authorities in Tombstone, Arizona.

Powers and abilities
Red Raven's costume was reinforced synthetic stretch fabric containing miniature anti-gravity mechanisms, as well as large artificial wings which allowed the Red Raven to fly. He was armed with the Bird-People's advanced weaponry, including a ray gun and an anti-gravity gun. He was proficient in basic hand-to-hand combat techniques uniquely styled to make use of his advantage of flight.

As a Bird-Person, Dania was born with operative wings, hollow bones, and other adaptions for flight.

Redford Raven had no inherent superpowers. He possessed a pair of artificial wings and used them to glide on the wind.

References

External links

Original Red Raven
Original Red Raven at Marvel Wiki
 Red Raven at Don Markstein's Toonopedia. Archived from the original on January 5, 2017.
Nevins, Jess. Red Raven at A Guide To Marvel's Golden Age Characters
Diamond Galleries Scoop: "Did You Know...?" (column of Oct. 25, 2002): "The Short Run of the Red Raven"

Second Red Raven (Dania)
Red Raven (Dania) at Marvel Wiki

Redford Raven ("Red Raven")
Red Raven (Redford Raven) at Marvel Wiki

Characters created by Dick Ayers
Characters created by Joe Simon
Characters created by Scott Lobdell
Characters created by Stan Lee
Comics characters introduced in 1940
Comics characters introduced in 1964
Comics characters introduced in 1992
Golden Age superheroes
Marvel Comics supervillains
Marvel Comics superheroes
Timely Comics characters